Teso District may refer to:

 Teso District, Kenya
 Teso District, Uganda